Churuk may refer to:
 Churuk-e Olya
 Churuk-e Sofla